The Japanese Bobtail is a breed of domestic cat with an unusual bobtail more closely resembling the tail of a rabbit than that of other cats. The variety is native to Japan, though it is now found throughout the world. The breed has been known in Japan for centuries, and it frequently appears in traditional folklore and art.

As in most other breeds, Japanese Bobtails may have almost any color (or colors, arranged in any number of patterns). Predominantly-white  are especially favored by the Japanese and by cat fanciers, and strongly represented in folklore, though other colorations are also accepted by breed standards.

History
One theory of short-tailed cats in Japan indicates that they arrived from the Asian continent at least 1,000 years ago. In 1602, Japanese authorities decreed that all cats should be set free to help deal with rodents threatening the nation's silkworm population and associated industry. At that time, buying or selling cats was illegal, and from then on, bobtailed cats lived on farms and in the streets. Japanese Bobtails thus became the "street/farm  cats" of Japan.

Around 1701, in Kaempfer's Japan, the first book written by a Westerner about the flora, fauna, and landscape of Japan, German doctor Engelbert Kaempfer wrote, "there is only one breed of cat that is kept. It has large patches of yellow, black and white fur; its short tail looks like it has been bent and broken. It has no mind to hunt for rats and mice but just wants to be carried and stroked by women."

In 1968, Elizabeth Freret is the first known person to have imported the Japanese Bobtail to the Western Hemisphere from Japan. The short hair Japanese Bobtail was accepted for Championship status in the Cat Fanciers' Association in 1976. Recognition for the long hair variety followed in 1993. As of 2013, there are a number of Japanese Bobtail breeders, most of which are based in North America with a few in Europe and at least one in Japan; yet the breed remains rare.

The Bobtail cats are considered to be a lucky breed and to own one promises prosperity and happiness. The tricoloured, Mi-Ke (pronounced 'mee keh')  is known as the luckiest colour for this breed. There is a Japanese statue of a cat with its paw in the air called Maneki Neko (translates to 'beckoning cat') and is an artist interpretation of the bobtail. These statues are common in many Japanese shops as they are thought to attract good people.

Breed standard
The Japanese Bobtail is a recognised breed by all major registering bodies, with the exception of the Governing Council of the Cat Fancy (GCCF), the domestic registry of the United Kingdom.

Head: The head should form an equilateral triangle. (Not including ears)
Ears: Large, upright, set wide apart but at right angles to the head and looking as if alert.
Muzzle: Fairly broad and round neither pointed nor blunt.
Eyes: Large, oval rather than round. They should not bulge out beyond the cheekbone or the forehead.
Body: Medium in size (usually 2.7 - 4kg, or 6 - 9lbs). males larger than females. Long torso, lean and elegant, showing well developed muscular strength. Balance is also very important.
Neck: Not too long and not too short, in proportion to the length of the body.
Legs: Long, slender, and high. The hind legs longer than the forelegs.
Paws: Oval.
Toes: five in front and four behind.
Coat (Shorthair): Medium length, soft and silky.
Coat (Longhair): Length medium-long to long, texture soft and silky gradually lengthening toward the rump.
Tail: The tail must be clearly visible and is made up of one or more curved articulations.

While harlequin and van patterns (color on the crown of the head and the tail only) and solid white, are favored by many, any coat color or pattern of colors is permissible.

Breed characteristics

Personality 
This breed is good for families. Due to their affectionate nature, they are well suited pets for children and communicate with people using soft chirpy noises. This breed is highly attracted to water, very smart, and known for playful behavior, always full of energy and mischief. A very loyal breed, Bobtails make great companions.

Grooming 
This breed has a minimal to medium amount of shedding, due to its short fur. Its coat is easy to groom.

Health 
Just like any animal, there can be a number of different health problems that could be related to the genetics. This being said, the Japanese Bobtails are generally healthy cats. The recessive gene paired with the shortened tails is not associated with any spinal or bone abnormalities.

The average lifespan for this breed is 9–15 years.

Care 
They enjoy climbing and can be prone to obesity.

Breeding and genetics

Mutation
The short tail is a cat body-type mutation caused by the expression of a dominant gene.  The tail is both shortened and kinked in Japanese Bobtails. The gene is fixed/always homozygous in the breed, so generally all kittens born to even one Japanese Bobtail parent will have bobtails as well. A bobtailed cat that is heterozygous for the gene may have kittens with or without the trait.  Unlike the dominant Manx gene, the Bobtail gene is not associated with skeletal disorders. The Bobtail gene causes a reduced number of tail vertebrae, as well as some fusion of tail vertebrae. This type of tail is not only unique to the breed but also to each individual cat, no two are exactly alike. For it to be considered a true bob tail cat the tail must not exceed three inches from the point of extension to the tailbone.

See also Cat body-type mutation: Tail types

Health
Recent scientific studies on cat genetics led by researchers has indicated that the Japanese Bobtail breed is one of the most genetically diverse of pedigree breeds. Compared with other breeds, Japanese Bobtails tend to have smaller litters with the kittens being proportionally larger at birth and developing at a faster rate. Kitten mortality rates are reported to be comparatively low.

Odd-eyed specimens

Rarely, a Japanese Bobtail, especially a predominantly white specimen, may have heterochromia, or eyes of different colors. Regardless of breed, cats with this trait are known as odd-eyed cats. In this breed, one iris is blue ("silver" in Japanese breeding terms) while the other is yellow ("gold"). This trait is more common in this breed than in most others, with the notable exception of the Turkish Van.

Behavior
Generally speaking, members of the breed are active, intelligent cats, with a strongly human-oriented nature, are easier to train to perform tricks than most breeds, and are more likely to enjoy learning human-mediated activities like walking on a harness and leash, and playing fetch. They are very attentive, alert felines that notice a lot. Considered an unusually "talkative" breed, they often interact vocally with people. Their soft voices are capable of nearly a whole scale of tones, leading to a folk belief that they can sing.

Folklore and legend

Cats are featured prominently in Japanese folklore. As in many other traditions around the world, cats are frequently objects of fear and mistrust, with various supernatural abilities ascribed to them. But in some Japanese stories, the length of their tails is an important plot point, with the Japanese Bobtail seen as auspicious, while long-tailed cats may be suspected of being , a type of evil spirit.

The  ('beckoning cat' or 'inviting cat'), an image of a Japanese Bobtail seated with one paw raised, is considered a good-luck charm among the Japanese around the world, who often keep a statue of this figure in the front of stores or homes (most often a stylized calico, though gold and black variants are also common). This stems from a legend that tells how a man (usually either a priest or member of the royal family) who owned one of these cats looked up one day to see his cat beckoning to him. Thinking the cat might have a message from the gods, he arose and went to it; no sooner had he done so than a branch large enough to kill a man fell where he had been sitting just moments before. Japanese Bobtails also feature prominently in traditional Japanese painting.

One legend of the origin of the breed's short tail, tells of a sleeping cat whose long tail caught fire; it then ran through town, spreading flames everywhere. With the capital in ashes, the Emperor decreed that all cats should have their tails cut short as a preventative measure.

While legends and superstitions may have favored the short-tailed breed, it seems likely that the Bobtail simply has a longer history in Japan than other recognizable breeds. It is also likely to have carried much prestige, having originated on the continent and arrived via Korea in the Asuka period (6th century CE), along with other prized articles of Chinese culture.

In popular culture
The manga character Hello Kitty resembles a Japanese Bobtail, and is an example of contemporary  ('cute') pop culture. The character Muta from The Cat Returns was based on a stray Japanese Bobtail that would often visit Studio Ghibli. They also tend to appear in other anime produced in Japan.

In W Is for Wasted, by Sue Grafton (part of her alphabet mystery series), private investigator Kinsey Millhone and her landlord Henry Pitts acquire a Japanese bobtail and name him Ed. During a fight with a deranged murder suspect, Ed scratches the killer, thereby saving Kinsey from death by scalpel.

Mochi, Hiro Hamada's cat in the Disney film Big Hero 6, is also a Japanese Bobtail.

In illustrator Jenny Parks's 2017 book Star Trek Cats, Hikaru Sulu is depicted as a Japanese Bobtail.

See also

Kurilian Bobtail
Sphynx

References

External links

Cat breeds
Cat breeds originating in Japan
Cat breeds and types with suppressed tails
Natural cat breeds